Cyperus rigens is a species of sedge that is native to parts of South America.

The species was first formally described by the botanists Carl Borivoj Presl and Jan Svatopluk Presl in 1828.

See also 
 List of Cyperus species

References 

rigens
Plants described in 1828
Flora of Argentina
Flora of Bolivia
Flora of Brazil
Flora of Chile
Flora of Paraguay
Flora of Peru
Taxa named by Jan Svatopluk Presl
Taxa named by Carl Borivoj Presl